The House of Mourouzis or Moruzi (Muruzi) is the name of an old and distinguished noble family which was first mentioned in the Empire of Trebizond, whose members later occupied many important positions within Ottoman Empire, Wallachia, Moldavia, Russian Empire and Romania.

History 
Its origins have been lost, but the two prevalent theories are that they were either a local family originating in a village which has a related name or else one that arrived with the Venetians during the Fourth Crusade (since there are records of a Venetian family with a similar name a generation earlier). They became one of the leading families of Phanariotes. The family moved to present-day Romania (the Danubian Principalities) in the 17th century, became Dragomans of the Porte and boyars, and gave Wallachia and Moldavia two hospodars – Princes Constantine and Alexander. Constantine's great grandson Demetrius fled to Russia after the outbreak of the Greek War of Independence, where his progeny was permitted to use their Princely title in 1893 and later in 1905. Members of the family remained in Romania and Bessarabia until the Soviet occupation post-World War II.

Notable  members 
Constantine Mourouzis (1730 – 1 May 1787), Dragoman of the Fleet, Grand Dragoman and Prince of Wallachia and Moldavia
Alexander Mourouzis (1750/1760 – 1816), Grand Dragoman of the Ottoman Empire and Prince of Wallachia and Moldavia
Panagiotis Mourouzis, Dragoman of the Fleet and Dragoman of the Porte
Michael Mourouzis, (d. 1821) Dragoman of the Fleet
Alexandru Constantin Moruzi (1815–1878), Romanian economist and politician
Dumitru C. Moruzi (1850–1914), Moldavian-born Imperial Russian and Romanian civil servant, folklorist and writer
Maria Moruzi-Cuza (d. 1921), wife of Ion I. C. Brătianu, and mother of Gheorghe I. Brătianu

Former properties of the Princes Muruzi

See also
Muruzi House

References
Iurie Colesnic, Reîntoarcerea pribeagului (on Dumitru C. Moruzi and his family) .
Petre Out, ""Adevărul rămâne oricare ar fi soarta celor care l-au servit". Gh.I.Brătianu – un istoric printre politicieni", in Dosarele Istoriei, 1/VI, 2001.

External links
The Moruzi Family Manor 

Mourouzis family
Greek noble families
Romanian people of Greek descent
Phanariotes
Romanian boyar families